Bonanza Town is a 1951 American Western film directed by Fred F. Sears who plays the villain and starring Charles Starrett, Myron Healey, and Luther Crockett. It is part of the Durango Kid series.

It was shot at the Iverson Ranch. The film's art direction was by Charles Clague.

Plot

Cast
 Charles Starrett as Steve Ramsay / The Durango Kid 
 Fred F. Sears as Henry Hardison 
 Luther Crockett as Judge Anthony Dillon 
 Myron Healey as Krag Boseman 
 Charles Horvath as Henchman Smoker 
 Slim Duncan as Slim Duncan 
 Smiley Burnette as Smiley Burnette

References

Bibliography
 Pitts, Michael R. Western Movies: A Guide to 5,105 Feature Films. McFarland, 2012.

External links
 

1951 films
1951 Western (genre) films
American Western (genre) films
Films directed by Fred F. Sears
Columbia Pictures films
American black-and-white films
1950s English-language films
1950s American films